Albert sagt… Natur – aber nur! (Albert Says... Nature Knows Best) was a German science cartoon series which was broadcast with 13 episodes on ZDF between 1996 and 1997.
The series is based on the books of Frederic Vester, and in foreground was the teaching of environmental and ecological awareness.

A spin-off series, called Albert auf Entdeckungstour (Albert Asks What is Life?), was released in 2002.

Currently both the series and its spinoff air on the Fix & Foxi and RiC television stations worldwide. Albert Says... Nature Knows Best is also airing in Asia, Latin America, the Middle East and the United States on the ZooMoo television channel.

Content
The main character Albert is a mythical creature that resembles a combination between a bird and a hamster. Albert, although cheeky, is characterized by curiosity and kindness, and he gets along with all animals. Albert goes on adventures to explain the workings of nature and the environment. He can fly, run, swim and dive, as well as change his size to become giant or tiny. This allows him to study nature with utmost attention to detail and increase his knowledge. In addition to the importance of nature and the environment, the animated series brings awareness to potential hazards and environmental problems. In particular, hazards arising from human or machine threat are discussed.

See also
List of German television series

External links
 

1996 German television series debuts
1997 German television series endings
Australian Broadcasting Corporation original programming
German children's animated comedy television series
German-language television shows
ZDF original programming